Robert Wilton Bungey  (4 October 1914 – 10 June 1943) was an Australian fighter pilot of the Royal Air Force (RAF) and later the Royal Australian Air Force (RAAF) during the Second World War. Officially, he was credited with five aerial victories and thus qualified as a flying ace but there is some uncertainty regarding this.

From Fullarton, in Adelaide, Bungey joined the RAAF in 1936 but after completing his flight training was discharged and accepted on a short service commission in the RAF. He was sent to the United Kingdom, where he was posted to No. 226 Squadron and flew Fairey Battles in the early stages of the Second World War. After the Battle of France, he transferred to Fighter Command and was posted to No. 145 Squadron. He flew in the later stages of the Battle of Britain. Promoted to squadron leader in February 1941 he was given command of the Australian No. 452 Squadron, which he led for several months. Later in the war he commanded RAF stations before relinquishing his commission in January 1943 and transferred to the RAAF reserve. He returned to Australia later in the year. He was due to take command of a fighter wing in the far north of Australia but, distraught and depressed after the recent death of his wife, he shot himself and his son in Adelaide. The son survived and later wrote a biography of his father.

Early life
Robert Wilton Bungey, the son of Ernest and Ada Blanche Bungey, was born on 14 October 1914 at Fullarton, a suburb of Adelaide, South Australia. He was educated at Glenelg Primary School before going on to Adelaide High School. After completing his schooling, he found employment as a clerk in the insurance industry. 

In July 1936, Bungey entered the Royal Australian Air Force (RAAF) and went to Point Cook for flight training as an air cadet. After 12 months, his course  completed and he was discharged from the RAAF to take up a short service commission in the Royal Air Force (RAF). On 26 August 1937, he was commissioned as a pilot officer for a five-year period of service in the RAF. Bungey was posted to No. 226 Squadron, a unit of Bomber Command that operated the Fairey Battle light bomber from Harwell. In May 1939, he was promoted to flying officer.

Second World War
Shortly after the outbreak of the Second World War, No. 226 Squadron was sent to France as part of the Advanced Air Striking Force (AASF). It was one of ten bomber squadrons of the AASF. The squadron made several attacks on the advancing German forces in the days following the commencement of the invasion of France and the Low Countries on 10 May 1940, including raids on the bridges across the Albert Canal. The bomber squadrons of the AASF suffered heavy casualties and the squadron was subsequently evacuated back to England in mid-June. Afterwards Bungey volunteered for a transfer to Fighter Command, which was short of pilots, and completed a conversion course on the Hawker Hurricane fighter.

In September, having been promoted to flight lieutenant, Bungey was posted to No. 145 Squadron. His new unit operated Hurricanes from Drem, where it was resting after being heavily involved in the Battle of Britain. It carried out patrols over the North Sea until returning south to the RAF station at Tangmere as part of No. 11 Group. The pace of operations had slowed by this time, but there was still the occasional engagement. In one of these, on 7 November, Bungey was shot down. He baled out of his Hurricane, injuring his knee as he did so, and landed near the Isle of Wight. Returning to his squadron, Bungey shared in the destruction of a Junkers Ju 88 medium bomber on 9 November; the stricken aircraft was seen to crash near Villaroche. He was credited with a share in a destroyed Heinkel He 111 bomber on 11 December. Shortly afterwards, the squadron began to convert to the Supermarine Spitfire fighter.

Channel Front
No. 145 Squadron resumed offensive operations in early 1941 and at the start of February, Bungey was promoted to squadron leader. On 10 March he shot down a Ju 88 over the English Channel. The knee that he had injured the previous November continued to trouble him and he was taken off operations at the end of the month for medical treatment.

On 15 June, Bungey took command of No. 452 Squadron, the first of the Australian Article XV squadrons to be formed in Fighter Command. Until Bungey became its leader, the squadron was commanded by a British officer. At the time he joined the unit, it was engaged in convoy patrols, flying Spitfires from Kirton-in-Lindsey. In July, it began to be involved in offensive operations, the first being a 'Circus' on 11 July. He would subsequently establish a reputation for his leadership and administration skills, reportedly often giving inexperienced pilots the opportunity for easy aerial victories rather than taking them himself. He was awarded the Distinguished Flying Cross (DFC) in October; the citation, published in The London Gazette, read:

To the surprise of his family and friends, in October, Bungey married Sybil Johnson, an English woman from Berkshire. The couple had been engaged for some time. The following year she travelled to Australia and gave birth to a son, Richard, the following month in Adelaide.

On 4 November, No. 452 Squadron was flying as cover for spotter aircraft directing the firing of the Dover coastal artillery across the English Channel when they were attacked by a large group of Messerschmitt Bf 109 fighters. In the resulting dogfight, Bungey destroyed one of the Bf 109s. He destroyed another Bf 109 on 6 December. Offensive operations tailed off over the winter months, and relatively few missions were undertaken. Bungey's tenure as commander of No. 452 Squadron ended on 25 January 1942.

Later war service
Bungey was subsequently promoted to wing commander and posted to the RAF station at Shoreham as its commander; he later fulfilled a similar role at Hawkinge. In January 1943, he relinquished his commission and he was transferred to the reserve of the RAAF. He returned to Australia, reuniting with his wife Sybil and meeting his son Richard for the first time. He was scheduled to take up a posting as a commander of a fighter wing in the far north of Australia. Within a matter of weeks after his arrival, Sybil Bungey took ill and died in hospital on 27 May.

In the early afternoon of 10 June, distraught and depressed at the death of his wife and concerned about his ability to care for his son, Bungey took Richard to North Brighton Beach. He shot his son in the head before turning his revolver to his own head and fatally shooting himself. The pair were discovered in the late afternoon; Richard Bungey, who was still alive, was taken to hospital. 

Bungey was buried alongside his wife in the cemetery at St Jude's Church at Brighton on 12 June, in a well-attended ceremony. Five senior officers of the RAAF acted as pallbearers, along with Bungey's brother, who also served in the RAAF. Richard Bungey subsequently recovered sufficiently that he was discharged from hospital care in late July.

Legacy
At the time of his death, Bungey was officially credited with five aerial victories. Having included Bungey in their 1961 book listing all of the flying aces of the British and Commonwealth air forces of the Second World War, military aviation historians Christopher Shores and Clive Williams specifically excluded him from their 1994 update of their book. In doing so, they acknowledged including him in the original edition in error.  

Richard Bungey, who recovered from his wounds of 10 June 1943, later wrote a biography of his father, which was published as Spitfire Leader. In August 2019 he advocated for a memorial plaque for Bungey in the city of Holdfast Bay, near Adelaide, and this was approved in January 2021. There were some reservations from city councillors, concerned at the perception of honouring Bungey given the circumstances of his death.

Notes

References

 

1914 births
1943 deaths
Military personnel from South Australia
Royal Air Force officers
Royal Australian Air Force officers
Australian World War II flying aces
The Few
Recipients of the Distinguished Flying Cross (United Kingdom)
Royal Air Force personnel of World War II
Australian military personnel who committed suicide
Suicides by firearm in Australia
Deaths by firearm in South Australia
Suicides in South Australia
People from Adelaide
People educated at Adelaide High School
Burials in South Australia